Ratcity in Blue is a 1976 album by the Good Rats and was released on the Platinum Records label.

Track listing
Words and music by Peppi Marchello—arranged by the Good Rats
 "Does It Make You Feel Good" 3:29
 "Boardwalk Slasher" 3:53
 "Ratcity In Blue" 4:53
 "Reason To Kill" 5:05
 "Writing The Pages" 3:03
 "The Room" 4:07
 "Almost Anything Goes" 2:41
 ″Advertisement In The Voice" 3:19
 "Yellow Flower" 2:39
 "Tough Guys" 2:33
 "Hour Glass" 3:21
 "Mean Mother" 2:37

† Bonus track on Jem / Ratcity Records re-issue

Personnel
Peppi Marchello – lead vocals
Mickey Marchello – guitar, vocals
Lenny Kotke - bass, vocals
John "The Cat" Gatto - guitar
Joe "Brasciola" Franco - drums

Sources
Good Rats' Ratcity In Blue album cover - Album Art By: Mike Mancusi

1976 albums
The Good Rats albums